Nash House may refer to:

in the United States (by state)
Nash-Reid-Hill House, Jonesboro, AR, listed on the NRHP in Arkansas
Nash House (409 East 6th Street, Little Rock, Arkansas), listed on the NRHP in Arkansas 	
Nash House (601 Rock Street, Little Rock, Arkansas), listed on the NRHP in Arkansas
Fisher-Nash-Griggs House, Ottawa, IL, listed on the NRHP in Illinois
Nash-McDonald House, Anchorage, KY, listed on the NRHP in Kentucky
Dr. Nash House, Clay Village, KY, listed on the NRHP in Kentucky
William M. Nash House, Cherryfield, ME, listed on the NRHP in Maine
Charles W. Nash House, Flint, MI 
Rev. J. Edward Nash Sr. House, Buffalo, NY, listed on the NRHP in New York
Arthur C. and Mary S.A. Nash House, Chapel Hill, NC, listed on the NRHP in North Carolina
Hazel-Nash House, Hillsborough, NC, listed on the NRHP in North Carolina
Nash-Hooper House, Hillsborough, NC, listed on the NRHP in North Carolina
Nash-Swindler House, Fort Gibson, OK, listed on the NRHP in Oklahoma
William R. Nash House, Houston, TX, listed on the NRHP in Texas